Alex Krizhevsky is a Soviet Ukrainian-born Canadian computer scientist most noted for his work on artificial neural networks and deep learning. Shortly after having won the ImageNet challenge in 2012 with AlexNet, he and his colleagues sold their startup, DNN Research Inc., to Google. Krizhevsky left Google in September 2017 after losing interest in the work, to work at the company Dessa in support of new deep-learning techniques. Many of his numerous papers on machine learning and computer vision are frequently cited by other researchers. He is the creator of the CIFAR-10 and CIFAR-100 datasets.

References

External links
 Alex Krizhevsky's home page

Living people
Computer scientists
Artificial intelligence researchers
Computer vision researchers
Year of birth missing (living people)